Robert Blaine Wicks (born July 24, 1950) is a former wide receiver in the National Football League who played for the St. Louis Cardinals, the New Orleans Saints and the Green Bay Packers.  Wicks played college ball for Utah State University before being drafted by the Cardinals in the 8th round of the 1972 NFL Draft.  He played professionally for 2 seasons and retired in 1974.

References

1950 births
Living people
Players of American football from Pasadena, California
American football wide receivers
Utah State Aggies football players
St. Louis Cardinals (football) players
New Orleans Saints players
Green Bay Packers players